Sandy was an urban district in Bedfordshire, England between 1927 and 1974.

Formation
Prior to 1927, Sandy was a parish within the Biggleswade Rural District. On 1 April 1927 the parish became an urban district, with the parish council becoming an urban district council, and the area being removed from the Biggleswade Rural District. The new council held its first meeting on 1 April 1927 at the town's Fire Station. The first chairman of the urban district council was Alfred Cope, a Liberal, who had previously been the chairman of the parish council.

Premises

The council initially met in a council chamber on the first floor of the town's fire station at 10 Cambridge Road, as the parish council had previously done. Administrative office functions were carried out in various other locations around the town, notably at 18 St Neots Road, which was sometimes described as the Council Offices.

On 22 February 1946 the council purchased a house called Boyne House at 7 St Neots Road, paying £1,800 for it at auction. The council converted Boyne House to become its offices and meeting place, holding its first meeting there in June 1946.

Abolition
Sandy Urban District was abolished under the Local Government Act 1972, with the area becoming part of Mid Bedfordshire on 1 April 1974. A successor parish was created for the town, which initially continued to use the former urban district council's offices at Boyne House, before moving back to the former Fire Station at 10 Cambridge Road in 1978.

Mid Bedfordshire in turn was abolished in 2009, when the area became part of Central Bedfordshire.

References

Districts of England abolished by the Local Government Act 1972
History of Bedfordshire
Local government in Bedfordshire
Urban districts of England